Sudhir Kakar (born 25 July 1938) is an Indian psychoanalyst, novelist and author in the fields of cultural psychology and the psychology of religion.

Education and personal life
Kakar spent his early childhood near Sargodha, now in Pakistan and also in Rohtak, where his father was an additional district magistrate during the British Raj and during the partition of India, and the family moved quite a bit from city to city. At age eight he was enrolled as a boarder in Modern School, New Delhi; he would later write about homosexual encounters in the school dormitories.

He next attended St. Edward's School, Shimla. He began his Intermediate Studies at Maharaja's College, Jaipur, in 1953 after which his family sent him to Ahmedabad, where Kakar lived with his aunt Kamla Chowdhry, and attended engineering college. After his B.E. degree in mechanical engineering from Gujarat University 1958, Kakar obtained a master's equivalent in business administration (Dipl.-Kfm.) at the University of Mannheim (1960–64), and a doctor's degree in economics at the University of Vienna. He began his training in psychoanalysis at the University of Frankfurt's Sigmund-Freud Institute in 1971.

In 1975, Sudhir Kakar moved to Delhi with his aunt, Kamla.  Kakar now resides in Goa and is married to Katharina (born 1967), a German writer and a scholar of comparative religions. Kakar has two children, Rahul and Shveta, from his Indian ex-wife.

Career

After returning to India in 1975, Sudhir Kakar set up a practice as a psychoanalyst in Delhi where he was also the Head of Department of Humanities and Social Sciences at Indian Institute of Technology (1976-77). He has been 40th Anniversary Senior Fellow at the Centre for Study of World Religions at Harvard (2001–02), a visiting professor at the universities of Chicago (1989–93), McGill (1976–77), Melbourne (1981), Hawaii (1998) and Vienna (1974–75), INSEAD, France (1994-2013). He has been a Fellow at the Institute of Advanced Study, Princeton, Wissenschaftskolleg (Institute of Advanced Study), Berlin, Centre for Advanced Study of Humanities, University of Cologne.

Kakar was in private psychoanalytic practice in New Delhi for 25 years before moving in 2003 to his current place of residence in Goa, India. Since then he has his practice in Benaulim, a village in Goa. He is currently a Visiting Professor at Goa University.
He created controversy in a symposium regarding the Death Penalty for Child Rape in 2018 by advocating leniency towards perpetrators of child rape, emphasizing protection of the family reputation and the family bond over the child's safety.

Psychoanalysis and mysticism
A portion of Sudhir Kakar's work involves the relationship between psychoanalysis and mysticism. His analyses of personages include that of Swami Vivekananda in The Inner World (1978), Mohandas Gandhi in Intimate Relations (1989), and Ramakrishna in The Analyst and the Mystic (1991).

Kakar’s novel Ecstasy (2003) was "written exclusively for the senses of the skeptic and the mind of the mystic" and "is the beginning of a journey through the soulscape of spiritual India".  The story is set in Rajasthan of 1940s or 1960s

Psychoanalyst Alan Roland (2009) writes that when Kakar applies his psychoanalytic understanding to these "three spiritual figures [Swami Vivekananda, Gandhi, Ramakrishna]", his analyses are as "fully reductionistic as those of Jeffrey Masson". Roland also disputes the Kakar's theoretical understanding of mysticism from a psychoanalytic standpoint, and writes that it is "highly questionable whether spiritual aspirations, practices, and experiences essentially involve regression."

At a personal level, Kakar feels that spirituality for him consists of moments of profound connection with a person, nature, art, music, and for those who believe in God, with the Divine.
His spiritual beliefs have been influenced by a combination of a rationalistic, agonistic father and a religious, ritualistic mother.

Awards and honors

Kakar's was awarded the 1987 Boyer Prize for Psychological Anthropology of the American Anthropological Association. He received the Order of Merit, Federal republic of Germany, Feb. 2012,
Distinguished Service Award, Indo-American Psychiatric Association, 2007, Fellow, National Academy of  Psychology, India, 2007,
Member, Academie Universelle des Cultures, France, 2003, Abraham Kardiner Award, Columbia University, 2002, Rockefeller Residency, Bellagio. April–May 1999, Goethe Medal of Goethe Institut, Germany, 1998, Watumull Distinguished Scholar, University of Hawaii, Spring Semester, 1998, National Fellow in Psychology, Indian Council of Social Science Research, 1992–94,
MacArthur Research Fellowship, 1993–94, Jawaharlal Nehru Fellow, 1986–88, Homi Bhabha Fellow, 1979-80.Karolyi Foundation Award for Young Writers, 1963.
The French weekly Le Nouvel Observateur profiled Kakar as one of 25 major thinkers of the world while the German weekly Die Zeit profiled him as one of twenty one thinkers for the 21st century Oxford University Press, Delhi is in the process of publishing 4 volumes of Kakar’s essays in their series Great Thinkers of Modern Asia.

Works
Non-fiction
Mad and Divine: Spirit and Psyche in the Modern World
Inner World: A Psycho-Analytic Study of Childhood and Society in India: Psychoanalytic Study of Childhood and Society in India, OUP India, 2Rev Ed (14 October 1982)  (10),  (13)
Shamans, Mystics, And Doctors
Tales Of Love, Sex And Danger
Intimate Relations
The Colors Of Violence
The Indians
Die Inder. Porträt einer Gesellschaft (2006)
Kamasutra
Frederick Taylor
Understanding Organizational Behavior
Conflict And Choice
Identity And Adulthood
The Analyst And The Mystic
La Folle Et Le Saint
Culture And Psyche
The Indian Psyche
The Essential Writings Of Sudhir Kakar
A Book of Memory, 2011

Fiction
The Ascetic Of Desire
Indian Love Stories
Ecstasy
Mira And The Mahatma
The Crimson Throne
  The Devil Take Love

Further reading
T.G. Vaidyanathan & Jeffrey J. Kripal (editors): VISHNU ON FREUD'S DESK : A Reader in Psychoanalysis and Hinduism, Oxford University Press, Paperback (Edition: 2003)

See also 
Girindrasekhar Bose

Notes

References

External links
 Official website
 Asia Source interview

1938 births
Living people
Indian social sciences writers
Indian psychologists
Psychoanalysts
Indian spiritual writers
20th-century Indian novelists
Novelists from Haryana
People from Rohtak
People from Sargodha
Punjabi Hindus